Régis Lacote (born 25 April 1972) is a French CEO.
Since February 2018, he is the current CEO of Orly Airport, succeeding Marc Houalla.

Biography
A graduate from the ESIEE Amiens (1997) and the ENAC (Mastère spécialisé in airport management 1997), he began his career in 1998 as Safety Manager of the Roland Garros Airport. He joins Paris Aéroport group in 2002 where he performs several jobs. In February 2018, he became CEO of the Orly Airport.

References

École nationale de l'aviation civile alumni
Aviation in France
French businesspeople
1972 births
Living people
Knights of the Ordre national du Mérite